The 2014 Professional Indoor Football League season was the third season of the Professional Indoor Football League (PIFL).  The regular season began March 29, 2014, and ended on June 28, 2014.  Each team played a 12-game schedule.  The top 2 teams in each conference advanced to the playoffs that began on July 5. The final was played July 12, with the Nashville Venom defeating the Lehigh Valley Steelhawks to win their first league championship.

Pre-season
The Harrisburg Stampede joined the league, after playing two seasons in American Indoor Football. The Nashville Venom and the Trenton Freedom joined the league as expansion members. With complications surrounding the Albany Panthers franchise for the 2014 season, the Professional Indoor Football League (PIFL) introduced the Fire to replace the Panthers for the 2014 season. With the league running the team, PIFL Executive Director, Jeff Ganos was named the franchise's general manager and Cosmo DeMatteo was named the team's innaurgal head coach on February 27, 2014.

Regular season

Playoffs

Awards
Most Valuable Player - Warren Smith, Trenton Freedom   
Offensive Player of the Year - Phillip Barnett, Nashville Venom
Defensive Player of the Year - Devin Jones, Richmond Raiders
Offensive Rookie of the Year - Roger Jackson, Trenton Freedom
Defensive Rookie of the Year - Devin Jones, Richmond Raiders
Special Teams Player of the Year - Dwayne Hollis, Lehigh Valley Steelhawks
Coach of the Year - Billy Back, Nashville Venom

References

2014 Professional Indoor Football League season